The Music and Arts University of the City of Vienna (MUK) in Vienna, Austria, is a university of music and the arts. It was previously (2005−2015) named   (KONSuni, Konservatorium Wien University), and before that  (Conservatory of Vienna). The school attained university status on 15 June 2005, as a private institution.

Faculty 
 Linda Watson, American dramatic soprano

Notable alumni
Miguel del Águila, composer
 Wen Yi-jen, Taiwanese conductor
 Falco, Austrian singer

External links
 

Vienna
Music and Arts University of the City of Vienna
Music in Vienna
Educational institutions established in 1938
1938 establishments in Austria
Private universities and colleges in Austria